Mal Me Quer is a Brazilian comedy television series  that premiered on Warner TV in Brazil on February 7, 2019. It is the first Brazilian comedy original series released by Warner in a co-production with Boutique Filmes.

Premise 
After Marcel (Felipe Abib), a travel agent, goes bankrupt because of his business partner, he and his wife Olivia (Júlia Rabello) plot an insane and risky plan. They both decide that the only way to not lose all the properties they have is to get into court with a petition for divorce. As long as they need to do anything to keep this farce, they will find real motives for the divorce.

References

2019 Brazilian television series debuts
2010s Brazilian television series
Brazilian comedy television series
Portuguese-language television shows